Richmond-Point Grey was a provincial electoral district for the Legislative Assembly of British Columbia, Canada.  It first appeared in the provincial election of 1924 and lasted only through the election of 1928. It was created out of most of Richmond and abolished into Vancouver-Point Grey and Delta. 

For other ridings in the area of Richmond, British Columbia, please see New Westminster (electoral districts).

Election results 

|-

 
| style="width: 130px" |Liberal
|Hiram Perry McCraney
|align="right"|1,855 	
|align="right"|30.62%
|align="right"|
|-
|- bgcolor="white"
!align="left" colspan=3|Total
!align="right"|6,059 	
!align="right"|
!align="right"|
|}

|-
 
| style="width: 130px" |Liberal
|Robert Henry Carson
|align="right"|3,296 	
|align="right"|37.84%
|align="right"|
|align="right"|

|- bgcolor="white"
!align="right" colspan=3|Total Valid Votes
!align="right"|8,710
!align="right"|100.00%
!align="right"|
|- bgcolor="white"
!align="right" colspan=3|Total Rejected Ballots
!align="right"|150
!align="right"|%
!align="right"|
|- bgcolor="white"
!align="right" colspan=3|Turnout
!align="right"|
!align="right"|
!align="right"|
|}

External links 
Elections BC Historical Returns

Former provincial electoral districts of British Columbia
Politics of Richmond, British Columbia